Kim Poster (born 19 April 1957) is a London-based theatre producer  from New York City.

Early life 
Kim Poster was educated in middle and high school at the Convent of the Sacred Heart, a Roman Catholic school for girls on East 91st Street, New York. Poster returned to Convent of the Sacred Heart to give a talk about the first time she saw the play Amadeus, which she produced on Broadway at the Music Box Theatre. She was banned for five days from the concert hall at the Convent of the Sacred Heart for her views on Amadeus, the play. Poster said the issue arose as a result of "the musical scandal of it; well, the musical controversy, which the very same people who now come to opening night accept as truth."

Kim Poster trained in acting and classical music in New York City, performing in off Broadway productions and singing as part of an ensemble with the New York Philharmonic musicians and L’Ensemble. She majored in Theatre and English at Northwestern University. She also earned a J.D. degree in New York City and became a member of the bars of New York in 1987 and California in 1989.

Career 
Poster acted as associate producer in on the original Broadway production of Grand Hotel: The Musical, having secured Paramount Picture's investment in the production.  As Vice President of Productions at IRS Media, Poster oversaw various films including Tom & Viv, which received 2 Academy Award nominations. Poster relocated to London to produce theatre in 1993. In 2001 Poster established Stanhope Productions which produces projects in the London West End and on Broadway. Poster’s productions have been nominated for Olivier, Evening Standard, Critic Circle Awards and Tony Awards, and received the 2002 Best Play Olivier Award for Jitney and the Best Revival Olivier Award for Long Day's Journey Into Night.

On roles for leading actors, Poster, who produced Tennessee Williams' Summer and Smoke in London's West End in 2006, said that “one of the reasons producers revive Williams’ plays time and again is because he wrote brilliant roles that leading actresses want to play. Just as Lear is almost mandatory for a great actor, so Blanche du Bois in Streetcar and Amanda in The Glass Menagerie are iconic female roles.”

Theatre Productions

Film Productions

References

External links 
 Kim Poster at the Internet Broadway Database
 The Stage 100
 The Year of the Producer - Whats on Stage
 Producers who are one of a kind - TheStage.co.uk
 Digital Theatre and Stanhope Productions - 
 Kim Poster goes back to school - 
 On The World Stage – 
 Brittania Rules The Stage – 
 
 Kim Poster on Producing – 
 Independent Producers Join Forces – 
 Kim Poster and the Oliver Awards - 

  

1957 births
Living people
British theatre managers and producers
Northwestern University alumni
American theatre managers and producers